Sanaa, also spelled San'a or Sana, is a governorate of Yemen. Its capital is Sanaa, which is also the national capital. However, the city of Sanaa is not part of the governorate but instead forms the separate governorate of Amanat Al-Asemah. As of 2004, the population was 2,918,379 inhabitants. Within this place is Jabal An-Nabi Shu'ayb or Jabal Hadhur, the highest mountain in the nation and the Arabian Peninsula.

Geography

Adjacent governorates

 Amanat Al-Asemah (Sanaa city)
 Marib Governorate (east)
 Al Bayda Governorate (south)
 Dhamar Governorate (south)
 Raymah Governorate (southwest)
 Al Hudaydah Governorate (west)
 Al Mahwit Governorate (west)
 'Amran Governorate (northwest)
 Al Jawf Governorate (north)

Districts
Sanaa Governorate is divided into the following 16 districts. These districts are further divided into sub-districts, and then further subdivided into villages:

Northern
 Nihm District
 Arhab District

Western

 Hamdan District
 Bani Matar District (wherein is located Jabal An-Nabi Shu'ayb or Jabal Hadhur)
 Al Haymah Ad Dakhiliyah District
 Al Haymah Al Kharijiyah District
 Manakhah District
 Sa'fan District

Eastern
 Bani Hushaysh District
 Sanhan District
 Bilad Ar Rus District
 Attyal District
 Jihanah District
 Al Husn District
 Khwlan District
 Bani Dhabyan District

Populated places

Ad Da'ir
Ad Dabbat
Ad Dabr
Ad Dahrah
Ad Dar Al Bayda'
Ad Dayʽah
Ad Dilʽ
Ad Dummam
Ad Durub
Ad-Dafa
ʽAdar
ʽAfish
Al ʽAbbasi
Al ʽArashi
Al ʽArid, Yemen
Al ʽArif
Al ʽArus
Al ʽAtm
Al ʽIdiz
Al ʽIrrah
Al ʽUlliyah
Al ʽUrr
Al ʽUruq
Al Abraq, Yemen
Al Aljam
Al Aysar
Al Barar
Al Bashawil
Al Baslan
Al Fisirah
Al Ghalil
Al Ghiras
Al Hajjarah
Al Hajz
Al Hanajir
Al Hanakah
Al Harajah
Al harf
Al Harrah, Yemen
Al Hashishiyah
Al Hatab
Al Hatabah
Al Hatarish
Al Hawiri
Al Hayfah
Al Hijlah
Al-Hijrah
Al-Husayn, Yemen
Al-Jaʽadib
Al-Ja'If
Al-Jaʽr
Al-Jaby
Al-Jahili
Al-Jahiliyah, Sanaʽa
Al-Jalb
Al-Janadib
Al-Jannat
Al-Jarda'
Al-Jayrif
Al-Jiraf
Al-Jirah
Al-Jirmah
Al-Jirwah
Al-Jurn
Al-Kawlah
Al-Khamis
Al-Kharabah, Sanaʽa
Al-Kharibah
Al-Kharifi
Al-Khasamah
Al-Khirah
Al-Lakamah
Al-Lijam
Al-Lumi
Al-Maʽinah
Al-Ma'Khadh
Al-Ma'Mar
Al-Maʽshur
Al-Maʽyanah
Al-Madawir
Al-Madlaʽah
Al-Magharib
Al-Mahadhi
Al-Mahajir
Al-Mahaqirah
Al-Mahattah
Al-Makarib
Al-Manar, Sanaʽa
Al-Mantar
Al-Maqtuʽ
Al-Marahidah
Al-Marasib
Al-Marzamah
Al-Masajid, Sanaʽa
Al-Masinah
Al-Masnaʽah
Al-Matrat
Al-Mawqaʽ
Al-Mayqaʽ
Al-Miʽzab
Al-Miqash
Al-Miqyadah
Al-Mishraf
Al-Munaqqab
Al-Qadam
Al-Qadhaf
Al-Qalis
Al-Qarah, Sanaʽa
Al-Qasim, Sanaʽa
Al-Qasr
Al-Qirran
Al-Qufl, Sanaʽa
Al-Qulad
Al-Qurayshi
Al-Waqf, Yemen
Al-Watan, Sanaʽa
Al-Yaʽabir
Al-Yaʽar
ʽAlman
ʽAmad
ʽAmaqah
ʽAmbaq
ʽAmd
Amrash
‘Amri
An Nabat
An Najd
Anib
ʽAqlar
Ar Rabam
Ar Rahabah
Ar Ramad
Ar Rawdah, Sanaʽa
Ar Rawnah
Ar Rihabi
ʽAraqah
ʽArjaz
ʽArtam
Artil
As Salahi
As Salul
As Sawadayn
As Sirr, Yemen
As Sudah
As Sunnatayn
Asal, Yemen
Ash Sharaf, Sanaʽa
Ash Shiʽb al-Aswad
Ash Shutbah
ʽAshib
ʽAsr
At Tawilah
ʽAttan
ʽAwmarah
Az Zaby
Az Zafir
Az Zahrah
Az Zurah
Baʽadan
Bahkah
Bahlul, Yemen
Bahman, Yemen
Bakar, Yemen
Balsanah
Bani ʽAbbad
Bani ʽAbd
Bani ʽAsim
Bani ʽId
Bani ʽUtban
Bani Az Zubayr
Bani Dahman
Bani Dawud
Bani Dud
Bani Hawat
Bani Humi
Bani Jawbah
Bani Malik
Bani Mansur
Bani Marih
Bani Maymun
Bani Murrah
Bani Nukayʽ
Bani Qutran
Bani Sabʽah
Bani Shaddad
Bani Shubati
Bani Sulayman
Bani Sulih
Bani Za'Id
Bani Ziyad
Barhan
Baril, Yemen
Barran, Yemen
Bawʽan
Bayn ʽAmir
Bayt Ad Dayl
Bayt Adh Dhafif
Bayt Adh Dhi'B
Bayt ʽAdhran
Bayt al-ʽAli
Bayt al-ʽAnsi
Bayt al-Bihar
Bayt al-Ghawi
Bayt al-Hamra'
Bayt al-Hamudi
Bayt al-Haqr
Bayt al-Harithi
Bayt al-Hawiri
Bayt al-Hindawana
Bayt al-Huwayt
Bayt al-Jiddi
Bayt al-Mifdal
Bayt al-Mudʽi
Bayt al-Mushriqi
Bayt al-Qadi
Bayt al-Qamus
Bayt al-Qunayyah
Bayt al-Wishah
Bayt al-Yatim
Bayt al-Yisri
Bayt ʽAmir
Bayt an-Naʽam
Bayt An Nukhayf
Bayt ar-Rubuʽi
Bayt Ar Rumaym
Bayt Arhab
Bayt As Suwaydi
Bayt Az Zafiq
Bayt Az Zaydah
Bayt Az Zubdani
Bayt Az Zuwar
Bayt Baws
Bayt Bi'R Zanir
Bayt Daʽir
Bayt Dahrah
Bayt Fashid
Bayt Ghadir
Bayt Ghawbar
Bayt Habis
Bayt Hadir
Bayt Hanbas
Bayt Hirash
Bayt ʽIsa
Bayt Juhays
Bayt Jurayd
Bayt Kahin
Bayt Katmasar
Bayt Khulaqah
Bayt Mahdam
Bayt Mahfad
Bayt Majraz
Bayt Marran
Bayt Miʽyad
Bayt Naʽamah
Bayt Naʽim
Bayt Qatir
Bayt Radm
Bayt Rijal
Bayt Saʽd
Bayt Shaban
Bayt Shimran
Bayt Shu'ayb
Bayt Shubayl
Bayt Suwa
Bayt Umm Jalli
Bayt ʽUqab
Bayt Zabadan
Bi'R al-Hudhayl
Bid Bida
Daʽan
Fatihat
Ghabir
Ghadran
Ghayman
Ghulah Dhayfan
Ghurabah
Hababah
Habas, Yemen
Haddah
Hadir, Yemen
Hadrami, Sanaʽa
Hadran, Yemen
Hadur
Hafat Idris
Hafid, Yemen
Hajana
Hajar Saʽid
Hakam, Yemen
Halhal
Hallah, Yemen
Hamdani, Yemen
Hamidah
Hammar
Hanadan, Yemen
Harran, Yemen
Haz, Yemen
Hijrat al-Kibs
Husn Mashmal
Hutaib
Ibn Hajib
ʽIlaf
ʽIman
ʽInad
ʽIyal Musa
Ja'If Hamdan
Jaʽlal
Jabal ʽUras
Jabal al-Mururah
Jadar, Yemen
Jawb
Jidr al-Aʽla
Jidr al-Asfal
Jihanah
Jiharine
Jirban
Kabar, Yemen
Karin, Yemen
Khadarah
Khalaqah
Khamar
Kharab As Sanaf
Khiwan
Kushar
Lakamat al-Kuruf
Lakamat al-Miʽqab
Luluwah
Madam, Yemen
Madarah
Madhbah
Madhbal
Madid
Madinat Khayan
Madwal
Mafhaq
Mahajil
Mahall Rayd
Mahaqra
Mahwa Aser
Mahwash, Yemen
Malikah, Yemen
Manakhah
Manwar
Masʽud
Masaarde
Masham, Yemen
Masur, Yemen
Masyab
Matnah
Matwah
Mawsanah
Melaba
Mughrabi, Yemen
Naʽat, Yemen
Najr
Naqi al-Fardah
Naqil Yaslah
Nuʽḍ
Numayr, Sanaʽa
Nusayl Zirajah
Qahazah
Qamlan
Qarat Bani Suwar
Qaratil
Qarin, Yemen
Qarn Hashim
Qaryat al-Musalli
Qaryat al-Qabil
Qaryat al-ʽUrrah as-Sufla
Qaryat ʽAsr al-Asfal
Qataʽ
Quflat ʽUdhr
Qusayr, Yemen
Radman, Yemen
Rahabah
Raju, Yemen
Rakab
Rayʽan
Raymah
Rayshan
Rayshan Bani Matar
Riham
Rohm As Sufla
Ruhayqah
Ruhm al-ʽUlya
Ruhm As Sufla
Ruhub
Safia, Yemen
Samaʽ
Sanaʽa
Sanaf
Sanhan, Yemen
Sarf
Sawad, Yemen
Saʽwan
Sayh, Yemen
Sayyan
Shamlan, Yemen
Sharaf, Yemen
Shararah
Shatbi
Shaybirah
Sinaf
Sinan, Yemen
Sinwan
Sirwan, Yemen
Suʽut
Subar
Sudan, Yemen
Sudum
Sumayr
Suq al-Jumʽah
Suq As Sabt
Suq Bayt Naʽam
Suq Buʽan
Suryan
Thalsa'
Tubr
Tuzan
ʽUruq
ʽUwayrah
Waʽla
Waʽlan
Wadi al-Bi'R
Wadi al-Jar
Wadi Har
Waqash
Wasit, Sanaʽa
Wasl
Yashiʽ
Zijān

References

 
Governorates of Yemen